Dr. Chandler McCuskey Brooks (December 18, 1905 – November 29, 1989) was an American physiologist notable for his research on the relationships between the central nervous and endocrine systems. He was also known for his studies of the electrophysiology of the heart. Brooks was a member of the National Academy of Sciences. He also headed the physiology and pharmacology departments of the Long Island College of Medicine and a Guggenheim fellow (Medicine & Health, 1945).

Early life and education 
 1905: born in Waverly, West Virginia on December 18
 a bachelor's degree from Oberlin College
 1931: received a Ph.D. in biology from Princeton University
 1933-1948: Johns Hopkins University faculty
 1948: a professor and chairman of the physiology and pharmacology departments of the Long Island College of Medicine

References

External links
Kiyomi Koizumi and Mario Vassalle, "Chandler McCuskey Brooks", Biographical Memoirs of the National Academy of Sciences (2008)

1905 births
1989 deaths
American physiologists
Johns Hopkins University faculty
Princeton University alumni
Oberlin College alumni
Members of the United States National Academy of Sciences